Abadzekhia is an extinct genus of prehistoric snake mackerel that lived from the early to late Oligocene epoch in what is now the Caucasus Mountains of Southern Russia.

See also

 Prehistoric fish
 List of prehistoric bony fish

References

Oligocene fish
Gempylidae
Prehistoric perciform genera
Extinct animals of Russia
Fossil taxa described in 1985